Kuantan Bypass, Federal Route 3, AH18, is a main highway bypass in Kuantan, Pahang, Malaysia.

Route background
The Kuantan Bypass starts at Kuantan Airport South Interchange, at its interchange with the Federal Route 2, the main trunk road of the central of Peninsular Malaysia.

At most sections, the Kuantan Bypass was built under the JKR R5 road standard, allowing maximum speed limit of up to 90 km/h.

There are no alternate routes or sections with motorcycle lanes.

History
It was built in 1977 until it was completed in 1979.

The upgrade from trunk road bypass into dual carriageway bypass was begun in 2005 and was completed in 2007.

List of interchanges

1979 establishments in Malaysia
Highways in Malaysia